Lincoln Hotel or Hotel Lincoln may refer to:

United States

 Lincoln Hotel (San Diego), part of the Gaslamp Quarter Historic District in San Diego, California
 Lincoln Hotel, part of the Downtown Loveland Historic District in Loveland, Colorado
 Lincoln Hotel (Melbourne, Florida), now Florida Preparatory Academy
 Urbana-Lincoln Hotel-Lincoln Square Mall, Urbana, Illinois, listed on the National Register of Historic Places in Champaign County, Illinois
 Lincoln Hotel, part of the State Street Commercial Historic District in Hammond, Indiana
 Lincoln Hotel (Lowden, Iowa), listed on the NRHP in Cedar County, Iowa
 Lincoln Hotel (Franklin, Nebraska), listed on the NRHP in Franklin County, Nebraska
 Hotel Lincoln (Lincoln, Nebraska), run by the Eppley Hotel Company
 Lincoln Hotel (Scottsbluff, Nebraska), listed on the NRHP in Scotts Bluff County, Nebraska
 Hotel Lincoln (New York City), now the Row NYC Hotel
 Hotel Lincoln (Stroud, Oklahoma), listed on the NRHP in Lincoln County, Oklahoma
 Hotel Lincoln (Marion, Virginia), listed on the NRHP in Smyth County, Virginia
 Lincoln Hotel (Harrington, Washington), listed on the NRHP in Lincoln County, Washington

Other places
 Broadview Hotel (Toronto), Canada; formerly known at the Lincoln Hotel
 , an Art Deco hotel in Africa
 Row NYC Hotel, New York, formerly known as Hotel Lincoln

See also
 President Abraham Lincoln Hotel, Springfield, Illinois